The Palos Verdes Peninsula Land Conservancy (PVPLC) is a  non-profit organization that is based on the Palos Verdes Peninsula in southwestern Los Angeles County, California.

Its mission is "Preserving land and restoring habitat for the education and enjoyment of all".

The Conservancy is a land trust and environmental organization to protect natural areas in the Palos Verdes Hills and adjacent coastal Palos Verdes Peninsula areas. Habitats protected include those of the California chaparral and woodlands ecoregion and its Coastal sage scrub and Southern coastal grasslands subregions.

Preserves 
Founded in 1988, the Conservancy has protected  of open space as nature preserves on the Palos Verdes Peninsula.

White Point Nature Preserve 
The White Point Nature Preserve is located in San Pedro and features  of restored coastal sage scrub habitat, hiking and handicap access trails, and a  Nature Education Center overlooking the ocean and Santa Catalina Island.

Defense Fuel Supply Point 

The Defense Fuel Supply Point in San Pedro provides storage for military fuel reserves and is also home to the endangered Palos Verdes blue butterfly (Glaucopsyche lygdamus palosverdesensis), the “rarest butterfly on earth”. The DFSP mission is a restricted facility which receives, stores, and distributes diesel and jet fuels for military use in California, Arizona and Nevada. Coastal sage scrub is juxtaposed within pipelines and storage tanks, providing habitat for the Palos Verdes blue butterfly as well as the threatened California gnatcatcher (Polioptila californica), a small gray bird that is listed as threatened by the U.S. Fish and Wildlife Service.

Linden H. Chandler Preserve 
The Linden H. Chandler Preserve is a  property located in Rolling Hills Estates. Owned jointly by the City of Rolling Hills Estates and the Land Conservancy, intensive habitat restoration efforts have added native wildflowers and shrubs to the hillsides. Trails traverse its slopes and grasslands, passing by a recently restored wetland area.
The Linden H. Chandler Preserve was created in 1993 through a sale and donation of property by the Chandler heirs, who wanted to see the land preserved in their father's name, who was the founder of Chandler's Palos Verdes Sand and Gravel in Rolling Hills Estates.

Palos Verdes Nature Preserve 
The City of Rancho Palos Verdes owns most of the land and the Palos Verdes Peninsula Land Conservancy manages the preserve. The preserve is made up of 10 reserves: Abalone Cove Ecological Reserve, Agua Amarga Reserve, Alta Vicente Reserve, Portuguese Bend Reserve, Filiorum Reserve, Forrestal Reserve, Three Sisters Reserve, San Ramon Reserve, Vicente Bluffs Reserve, and Vista Del Norte Reserve.

Lunada Canyon Reserve 
The Lunada Canyon Reserve is a  canyon that was given to the Conservancy by the E.K Zuckerman family in 1992. It makes up part of the Palos Verdes Nature Preserve.

George F Canyon Preserve 
The  George F Canyon Preserve and Nature Center is owned by the City of Rolling Hills Estates, and operated by the Conservancy. A nature trail passes through one of the largest canyons on the Palos Verdes Peninsula. Visitors walk or ride on horseback through willow-riparian and coastal sage scrub habitats, culminating in a view of the Los Angeles Basin.

The George F Canyon Nature Center provides educational and recreational programs. Exhibits focus on themes such as butterflies, birds of the canyon, insects, plant habitats, animals and wildflowers.

Science and education 
The Conservancy works to save the landscape from past degradation from urbanization, agriculture uses, and the introduction of invasive foreign species. The goals of the Conservancy's science program are to increase the scientific knowledge base of the Palos Verdes Peninsula through collaborative research. The scientific program focuses on understanding the basic ecosystem functions that define the Palos Verdes Peninsula. Research is conducted both by Conservancy staff and through partnerships with universities, colleges and local agencies.

Research projects inform restoration, conservation, education, and stewardship programs and address the interface between the natural and urban environments. The Conservancy's research program was developed to involve collaborative researchers with the overall goal of increasing the scientific knowledge of the Palos Verdes Peninsula.

Local partnerships 
The Conservancy has worked with numerous Eagle Scouts, Girl Scouts and local groups on projects for them to help them achieve their awards while benefiting the local environment. Additionally, the Conservancy fosters partnerships between various local high schools, community colleges, and universities for environmental science and geography-related activities.

Youth Education Program 
Partnerships with local schools provide learning opportunities for many students. Youth Education programs include a third-grade nature walk program and projects with high school science classes and scout groups. Through these programs the Conservancy helps young students understand the significance of the Palos Verdes Peninsula's natural areas, empowering them to play a role in its preservation.

Third-Grade Naturalist Program 
The Naturalist program consists of a four-part, in-class educational unit covering local ecology, native plants, geology, history, Native-American culture, mammals, reptiles and insects. Lessons are taught by Conservancy educators and trained docents, with assistance from classroom teachers. Samples of plant materials, rocks, animal specimens and other teaching aids help students gain a hands-on understanding and instill an appreciation for nature.

Activities and fundraisers

Palos Verdes Pastoral 
Every fall, the Conservancy hosts a dinner inspired by open space in conjunction with Terranea Resort. The event is served under a harvest moon with ocean views in the background, with over 200 guests in attendance annually. Pastoral raises critical funds while highlighting the important role of the community in protecting natural areas.

Nature walks 
The Conservancy hosts a nature walks. Its walk leaders help visitors learn more about the Palos Verdes Peninsula such as the birds, wildlife, and plants that live in the canyons and undeveloped areas, and about the unique geology of the Peninsula.

See also

South Coast Botanic Garden

References

Land trusts in California
Palos Verdes Peninsula
Organizations based in Los Angeles County, California
Non-profit organizations based in California

Nature reserves in California
Parks in Los Angeles
Protected areas of Los Angeles County, California
San Pedro, Los Angeles
South Bay, Los Angeles
Environmental organizations established in 1988
1988 establishments in California
California chaparral and woodlands
Environment of Greater Los Angeles
Environmental organizations based in Los Angeles